Teamsters for a Democratic Union (TDU) is a grassroots rank and file organization whose goal is to reform the International Brotherhood of Teamsters (IBT), or Teamsters Union. The organization has chapters nationwide in the United States and Canada.

History 
TDU was started in Cleveland, Ohio, in the 1970s after the federal government exposed extensive corruption in the union, which included leadership raiding union-held pension funds, collusion with organized crime, and collusive collective bargaining between union officials and employers at the expense of union members.

TDU Influential Activists 

 Dan La Botz
 Pete Camarata
 Ron Carey
 Thomas Geoghegan
 Ken Paff

Endorsements
In November 2019, TDU members voted to endorse the Teamsters United O'Brien/Zuckerman slate for International President and Secretary/Treasurer.

References

Further reading
 Rank-and-File Rebellion: Teamsters for a Democratic Union by Dan La Botz, Penguin Random House, 1992
 Rebel Rank and File, Edited by Aaron Brenner, Robert Brenner, and Cal Winslow, Verso Books, 2010

External links
Teamsters for a Democratic Union Homepage
International Brotherhood of Teamsters (IBT) Homepage

International Brotherhood of Teamsters
Organizations established in 1976
Organizations based in Detroit
Trade union reform movements